Hayat or Hayet is an Arabic word which means "life".

People
 Hayat Boumeddiene, common law wife of Amedy Coulibaly, who perpetrated the Montrouge shooting in France in 2015
Hayat Kabasakal, Turkish management academic
Malik Asif Hayat, chairman of the Federal Public Service Commission of Pakistan
Hayat Mahmud, Bengali feudal lord and military commander
Heyat Mahmud, medieval Bengali poet

Places

 Hayat, Algeria, a city in Algeria
 Həyat, a village in Kalbajar Rayon, Azerbaijan
 Menzel Hayet, a town and commune in the Monastir Governorate, Tunisia
 Seyyed Ramazan, also known as Hāyeţ, a village in Khuzestan Province, Iran

Arts and media

Television
 Hayat TV (Bosnia and Herzegovina), a Bosnian TV network and TV channel founded in 1992
 Hayat TV (Turkey), a Turkish TV channel
 Hayat Folk, a Bosnian music TV channel dedicated to traditional "Sevdalinka" songs (founded in 2012)
 Hayat Music, a Bosnian music TV channel dedicated to world and Bosnian popular music (founded in 2012)
 Hayat Plus, a Bosnian satellite channel by Hayat TV (also known as Hayat Sat)

Media
 Al-Hayat, originally a Lebanese, then a pan-Arab newspaper
 Hayat (newspaper), an Iranian newspaper
 , an Azerbaijani newspaper published between 1905 and 1906

See also
Chait
Hayyoth (names)

Arabic words and phrases
Arabic feminine given names
Bengali words and phrases